Harald Büttner (born 13 April 1953) is a German former wrestler. He competed at the 1976 Summer Olympics and the 1980 Summer Olympics. Büttner was a seven-time national champion in East Germany, and also won multiple medals at the European and World Championships.

References

External links
 

1953 births
Living people
German male sport wrestlers
Olympic wrestlers of East Germany
Wrestlers at the 1976 Summer Olympics
Wrestlers at the 1980 Summer Olympics
People from Meissen
Sportspeople from Saxony
World Wrestling Champions
World Wrestling Championships medalists